Jauljibi is the small bazaar of Indo-Nepal border (Mahakali Zone) situated at the confluences of Kali and Gori Rivers. The name refers to bazaars on both sides of the river, with the Nepal-side bazaar being rather small compared to that on the Indian side. A suspension bridge on the Kali has joined the bazaars and the people of both countries for many years. The town is famous for its annual trade fair, popularly known as Jauljibi Mela. Thousands of people throng to Mela from the neighboring villages and districts.

Uttarakhand